Sohoa is a village in the commune of Chiconi on Mayotte.

Populated places in Mayotte